Nüydi (also, Nyugdi, Nyugdy, and Nyuydi) is a village and municipality in the Shamakhi Rayon of Azerbaijan.  It has a population of 632.

References 

Populated places in Shamakhi District